The Women's Slalom in the 2018 FIS Alpine Skiing World Cup involved 12 events, including three parallel races (one parallel slalom and two city events) and the season finale in Åre, Sweden.  

Defending champion Mikaela Shiffrin from the United States won nine of the twelve races for the season (seven of the nine slaloms and two of the three parallel races); this was Shiffrin's fifth discipline championship in slalom.

The season was interrupted by the 2018 Winter Olympics from 12-24 February 2018 at Yongpyong Alpine Centre (slalom and giant slalom) at the Alpensia Sports Park in PyeongChang and at the Jeongseon Alpine Centre (speed events) in Jeongseon, South Korea.  The women's slalom was held on 22 February.

Standings
 

DNF1 = Did Not Finish run 1
DSQ1 = Disqualified run 1
DNQ = Did not qualify for run 2
DNF2 = Did Not Finish run 2
DSQ2 = Disqualified run 2
DNS = Did Not Start

See also
 2018 Alpine Skiing World Cup – Women's summary rankings
 2018 Alpine Skiing World Cup – Women's Overall
 2018 Alpine Skiing World Cup – Women's Downhill
 2018 Alpine Skiing World Cup – Women's Super-G
 2018 Alpine Skiing World Cup – Women's Giant Slalom
 2018 Alpine Skiing World Cup – Women's Combined

References

External links
 Alpine Skiing at FIS website

Women's Slalom
FIS Alpine Ski World Cup slalom women's discipline titles